This is a complete list of basilicas of the Catholic Church. A basilica is a church with certain privileges conferred on it by the Pope.

Not all churches with "basilica" in their title actually have the ecclesiastical status, which can lead to confusion, since it is also an architectural term for a church-building style.

In the 18th century, the term took on a canonical sense, unrelated to this architectural style. Basilicas in this canonical sense are divided into major ("greater") and minor basilicas. Today only four, all in the Diocese of Rome, are classified as major basilicas: the major basilicas of St John Lateran, St Peter's, St Paul outside the Walls, and St Mary Major. The other canonical basilicas are minor basilicas.

By canon law no Catholic church can be honoured with the title of basilica unless by apostolic grant or from immemorial custom. The Basilica di San Nicola da Tolentino was the first minor basilica to be canonically created, in 1783. The 1917 Code of Canon Law officially recognised churches using the title of basilica from immemorial custom as having such a right to the title of minor basilica. Such churches are referred to as immemorial basilicas.

Basilicas in Asia

Basilicas in Africa

Basilicas in North and Central America and the Caribbean

Basilicas in South America

Basilicas in Australia and Oceania

Basilicas in Europe

Statistics
, there were 1,690 basilicas (four of them major; the rest minor) in the world.

Countries with more than 100 basilicas
 Italy (573) (includes 4 major basilicas)
 France (168)
 Spain (123)
 Poland (105)

Countries with between 10 and 100 basilicas

 United States (90)
 Germany (77)
 Brazil (53)
 Argentina (43)
 Colombia (40)
 Austria (35)

 Belgium (27)
 Mexico (27)
 Netherlands (27)
 Canada (24)
 India (23)
 Philippines (21)
 Venezuela (16)

 Czech Republic (16)
 Hungary (13)
 Peru (12)
 Switzerland (12)
 Ecuador (12)
 Portugal (12)
 Slovakia (11)

Cities and municipalities with more than 10 basilicas
 Rome (66) (includes 4 major basilicas)
 Buenos Aires (15)
 Kraków (13)
 Bologna (11)
 Florence (11)

Cities and municipalities with between five and 10 basilicas
 Naples (9)
 Barcelona (9)
 Milan (9)
 Venice (8)
 Cologne (6)
 Lima (6)
 Madrid (6)
 Santiago (6)

Cities and municipalities with five basilicas
 Genoa
 Jerusalem 
 Paris 
 Piacenza 
 Prague
 Turin

Cities and municipalities with four basilicas

 Bogotá
 Braga
 Gdańsk 
 Manila 
 Marseille 
 Montreal 
 New York City 
 Padua 

 Ravenna 
 Rio de Janeiro 
 Salvador 
 São Paulo 
 Seville 
 Trapani 
 Warsaw

Cities and municipalities with three basilicas

 Acireale 
 Assisi 
 Berlin 
 Bruges 
 Cagliari 
 Caltagirone 
 Caracas 
 Catania 
 Chicago 

 Düsseldorf 
 La Paz 
 Lecce 
 Lourdes 
 Málaga 
 Mantua 
 Monterrey 
 Nancy 
 Prato 
 Quito 

 Siena 
 Trier 
 Valencia 
 Vercelli 
 Verona 
 Vienna

Cities and municipalities with two basilicas

 Agrigento
 Aparecida
 Annecy 
 Arezzo 
 Bari 
 Barletta 
 Belo Horizonte 
 Bilbao 
 Bordeaux 
 Brescia 
 Budapest
 Caeté
 Cairo 
 Camerino 
 Capua 
 Cesena 
 Comiso 
 Como 

 Córdoba 
 Cusco 
 Częstochowa 
 Fano 
 Ferrara 
 Finale Ligure 
 Foggia 
 Forio 
 Forlì 
 Granada 
 Grenoble 
 Istanbul 
 Jerez de la Frontera 
 La Plata 
 León 
 Levoča

 Lisbon 
 Lucca 
 Lyon 
 Maastricht 
 Manizales
 Medellín 
 Mendoza
 Mexico City 
 Modena 
 Montefiascone 
 Montpellier 
 Nantes
 Narbonne 
New Orleans
 Nice 
 Nicosia 

 Ottawa 
 Palermo 
 Palma de Mallorca 
 Pesaro 
 Pistoia
 Quezon City 
 Rapallo 
 Regensburg 
 Reggio Emilia 
 Reims 
 Rennes 
 Rosario 
 Saint-Brieuc 
 Saintes 
 St Louis 
 Salta 

 San Lorenzo de El Escorial 
 San Salvador 
 Santa Fe 
 Sées 
 Savona 
 Sucre 
 Tolentino 
 Toronto
 Toulouse 
 Trento 
 Valletta 
 Viareggio 
 Viterbo 
 Wrocław 
 Zaragoza

Other basilicas
The following churches are often referred to as basilicas, but there does not appear to be evidence of their officially holding that status:

See also
 List of basilicas in Italy
 Basilicas of New Zealand

Footnotes

External links
 List of all Minor Basilicas from GCatholic
 List of all Basilicas in India from Notes on India
 Bunson, Matthew, ed. (2005) Catholic Almanac. Huntington, IN: Our Sunday Visitor. .